Captain Tatham of Tatham Island, sometimes shortened to Captain Tatham, is a 1909 adventure novel by the British writer Edgar Wallace. It is not told in a straight linear narrative, as with most Wallace novels, but instead consists of a series of witness statements by various characters involved. In subsequent rereleases its title was changed first to The Island of Galloping Gold and then Eve's Island.

An American adventurer sets out to found a new state on an uninhabited Pacific island. He supports his endeavour by running a thoroughbred racehorse in a series of English races and winning a fortune.

References

Bibliography
 Clark, Neil. Stranger than Fiction: The Life of Edgar Wallace, the Man Who Created King Kong. Stroud, UK: The History Press, 2015.

1909 British novels
Novels by Edgar Wallace
British adventure novels